Viktor Fyodorovich Aristov (9 June 1943 – 2 January 1994) was a Soviet film director and screenwriter. He directed five films between 1980 and 1994. His 1991 film Satan was entered into the 41st Berlin International Film Festival where it won the Silver Bear - Special Jury Prize.

Selected filmography

Actor
 Sherlock Holmes and Dr. Watson (1979)
 Among Grey Stones (1983)
 The Asthenic Syndrome  (1990)

Director
 A Twig in the Wind (1980)
 Gunpowder (1985)
 The In-Laws (1987)
 The First 100 Years are Hard (1988)
 Satan (1991)
 Rain in the Ocean (1994) - finished by Yuri Mamin

Screenwriter
 The Wife has left (1979)
 Gunpowder (1985)
 Satan (1991)
 Rain in the Ocean (1994)

References

External links

1948 births
1994 deaths
Soviet film directors
Soviet screenwriters
Male screenwriters
20th-century screenwriters
Russian State Institute of Performing Arts alumni
People from Chüy Region